A gravity dam is a dam constructed from concrete or stone masonry and designed to hold back water by using only the weight of the material and its resistance against the foundation to oppose the horizontal pressure of water pushing against it. Gravity dams are designed so that each section of the dam is stable and independent of any other dam section.

Characteristics 
Gravity dams generally require stiff rock foundations of high bearing strength (slightly weathered to fresh), although in rare cases, they have been built on soil foundations. The bearing strength of the foundation limits the allowable position of the resultant force, influencing the overall stability. Also, the stiff nature of the gravity dam structure is unforgiving to differential foundation settlement, which can induce cracking of the dam structure.

Gravity dams provide some advantages over embankment dams, the main advantage being that they can tolerate minor over-topping flows without damage, as the concrete is resistant to scouring. Large over-topping flows are still a problem, as they can scour the foundations if not accounted for in the design. A disadvantage of gravity dams is that, due to their large footprint, they are susceptible to uplift pressures which act as a destabilising force. Uplift pressures (buoyancy) can be reduced by internal and foundation drainage systems. During construction, the setting concrete produces an exothermic reaction. This heat expands the plastic concrete and can take up to several decades to cool. While cooling, the concrete is stiff and susceptible to cracking. It is the designer's task to ensure this does not occur.

Design 
Gravity dams are built by first cutting away a large part of the land in one section of a river, allowing water to fill the space and be stored. Once the land has been cut away, the soil has to be tested to make sure it can support the weight of the dam and the water. It is important to make sure the soil will not erode over time, which would allow the water to cut a way around or under the dam. Sometimes the soil is sufficient to achieve these goals; however, other times it requires conditioning by adding support rocks which will bolster the weight of the dam and water. There are three different tests that can be done to determine the foundation's support strength: the Westergaard, Eulerian, and Lagrangian approaches. Once the foundation is suitable to build on, construction of the dam can begin. Usually gravity dams are built out of a strong material such as concrete or stone blocks, and are built into a triangular shape to provide the most support.

Classifications 
The most common classification of gravity dams is by the materials composing the structure:
 Concrete dams include
 mass concrete dams, made of:
 conventional concrete: Dworshak Dam, Grand Coulee Dam
 Roller-Compacted Concrete (RCC): Willow Creek Dam (Oregon), Upper Stillwater Dam
 masonry: Pathfinder Dam, Cheesman Dam
 hollow gravity dams, made of reinforced concrete: Braddock Dam

Composite dams are a combination of concrete and embankment dams.  Construction materials of composite dams are the same used for concrete and embankment dams.

Gravity dams can be classified by plan (shape):
 Most gravity dams are straight (Grand Coulee Dam).
 Some masonry and concrete gravity dams have the dam axis curved (Shasta Dam, Cheesman Dam) to add stability through arch action.

Gravity dams can be classified with respect to their structural height:
 Low, up to 100 feet.
 Medium high, between 100 and 300 feet.
 High, over 300 feet.

Earthquakes 
Gravity dams are built to withstand some of the strongest earthquakes. Even though the foundation of a gravity dam is built to support the weight of the dam and all the water, it is quite flexible in that it absorbs a large amount of energy and sends it into the earth's crust. It needs to be able to absorb the energy from an earthquake because, if the dam were to break, it would send a mass amount of water rushing downstream and destroying everything in its way. Earthquakes are the biggest danger to gravity dams and that is why, every year and after every major earthquake, they must be tested for cracks, durability, and strength. Although gravity dams are expected to last anywhere from 50–150 years, they need to be maintained and regularly replaced.

References

Bibliography 
 
 

 
Dams by type